The 2010–11 Utah Utes men's basketball team represented the University of Utah. They played their home games at the Jon M. Huntsman Center in Salt Lake City, Utah, United States and were a member of the Mountain West Conference. They finished the season 13–18, 6–10 in Mountain West play and lost in the quarterfinals of the 2011 Mountain West Conference men's basketball tournament to San Diego State. On March 12, 2011, the University of Utah fired head coach Jim Boylen after consecutive losing seasons. Starting in July 2011, they will be leaving the Mountain West Conference and will join the Pac-12. Their leading scorer Will Clyburn was granted a scholarship release at the end of the season and subsequently transferred to Iowa State.

Roster

Schedule and results 

|-
!colspan=9| Exhibition

|-
!colspan=9| Regular season

|-
!colspan=9| Mountain West tournament

See also 
 2010–11 NCAA Division I men's basketball season
 2010–11 NCAA Division I men's basketball rankings

References

External links 
Utah Utes Basketball 2010-11 Schedule - Utes Home and Away - ESPN
Utah Utes 2010-11 Statistics - Team and Player Stats - Men's College Basketball - ESPN

Utah
Utah Utes men's basketball seasons
Utah Utes
Utah Utes